Thiru Parameswara Vinnagaram or Vaikunta Perumal Temple is a temple dedicated to Vishnu, located in Kanchipuram in the South Indian state of Tamil Nadu. Constructed in the Dravidian style of architecture, the temple is glorified in the Nalayira Divya Prabandham, the early medieval Tamil canon of the Alvar saints from the 6th through the 9th centuries CE. It is one among the 108 Divya Desams dedicated to Vishnu, who is worshipped as Vaikuntanathan and his consort Lakshmi as Sri Vaikundavalli. The temple is considered the second oldest extant temple in Kanchipuram after the Kailasanthar temple.

The temple is believed to have been built by the Pallava king Nandivarman II (731 CE–796 CE), with later contributions from Medieval Cholas and Vijayanagara kings. The temple is surrounded by a granite wall enclosing all the shrines and water bodies of the temple. Vaikuntanathan is believed to have appeared to king Viroacha. The temple follows Vaikasana Agama and observes six daily rituals and two yearly festivals. The temple follows Tenkalai mode of worship and is maintained and administered by the Hindu Religious and Endowment Board of the Government of Tamil Nadu. The temple is one of the prominent tourist attractions in the city.

Legend

As per Hindu legend, the region where the temple is located was called Vidarbha Desa and ruled by a king named Viroacha. Due to his misdeeds in preceding birth, Virocha had no heir. He prayed in Kailasanathar Temple and Shiva, the presiding deity of the temple gave a boon that the Dvarapalas (the gatekeepers) of the Vishnu temple will be born as sons to him. The princes were devoted to Vishnu and conducted yagna for the welfare of the people of their kingdom. Vishnu was pleased with the worship and appeared as Vaikundanatha to the princes. It is believed that in modern times Vishnu appears to devotees in the same form as he appeared to the Dvarapalakas Pallavan and Villalan.

As per another legend, sage Bharadvaja was doing penance at this place and was attracted by a celestial nymph. The sage married her and they both got a son. The sage returned to his penance, while the nymph returned to her denizen. Shiva and Vishnu undertook the child under their aegis. At the same time, a Pallava king worshipped Vishnu for the birth of a child. Vishnu gave the child to the king and named him Parameswara, who went on to become the Pallava king. The place is believed to have been named after the king.

History 
As per Dr. Hultzh, Parameswara Vinnagaram was constructed by the Pallava King Nandivarman II in 690 CE, while other scholars place it in the late 8th century. Nandivarman Pallavamallan was a worshipper of Vishnu and a great patron of learning. He renovated old temples and built several new ones. Among the latter was the Parameswara Vinnagaram or the Vaikunta Perumal temple at Kanchipuram which contains inscribed panels of sculpture portraying the events leading up to the accession of Nandivarman Pallavamalla to the throne. The great Vaishnava saint Thirumangai Alvar was his contemporary. There are various inscriptions in the temple that detail the socio-economic and political situation of the country during the Pallavan regime. Around the sanctum sanctorum in the first precinct, there is an inscription dated to the 8th century which records the gift of a bowl and an image made of gold measuring 1,000 sovereigns by king Abhimanasiddhi. During the period of Dantivarman I in 813, there was a gift of golden bowl weighing ten thousand kalanju. There was another gift of 3,000 kalanju of gold to meet daily expenses of the temple. A record of gift of a devotee named Thiruvaranga Manickam to feed devotees of Vishnu is also seen in the temple. The temple is believed to have been constructed few years after the construction of Kanchi Kailasanathar Temple. The bas reliefs in the temple reveal the war between the Pallavas and Gangas and also with Chalukyas.

Architecture

Paramesvara Vinnagaram is an earliest specimen of Dravidian architecture. The temple has a rectangular plan and approached through a flat granite gateway tower. The vimana has a stepped pyramidal roof and it resembles a vihara. Three sanctuaries host the image of Vishnu in different postures - seated (ground floor), lying (first floor; accessible to devotees only on ekadashi days) and standing (second floor; inaccessible to devotees).  The logical and complex plan of the temple provided a prototype for the much larger shrines to be constructed all over Tamil Nadu. The external cloisters, with their lion pillars, are predecessors of the grand thousand pillared halls of later temples. In modern times, the four lions have been replaced with Garuda (image of eagle mount of Vishnu).

The cloister walls have a sequence of relief sculptures depicting the history of the Pallava dynasty. The first set of panels show the supposedly divine lineage of the Pallavas starting from Brahma, followed by Angiras (sage), Bṛhaspati, Bharadvaja, Drona and Ashwatthama. These panels are followed by panels depicting the actual Pallava kings themselves. A typical panel shows the king on the left frame of the panel. In some cases, the coronation of the king is shown as can be seen by priests pouring sacred water on his head. The right side of the panel shows battle scenes or other events during that monarch's reign. The panels of Mahendravarman I and Narasimhavarman I show the battles with Pulakesin II of the Badami Chalukyas. Finally, there are panels that show the search and the finding of a successor after Paramesvaravarman II's early death. The successor is none other than Nandivarman II, who built this temple.

The niches on the walls around the sanctum are similar to the ones in Mahabalipuram. Some of the sculptures indicates various legends of Mahabaratha depicting the image of Dharmaraja, Arjuna and Bhima. The temple is built of granite with a mixture of sandstone. The three storied temple is the forerunner for various later built temples like Vaikunta Perumal temple at Uthiramerur, Koodal Azhagar temple at Madurai and Rajagopalaswamy temple at Mannargudi. The three stories are achieved with three concentric squares with a small passage in between with the top layer being closed by a filial.

Festivals and religious practices

The temple follows Vaikasana Agama. The temple priests perform the pooja (rituals) during festivals and on a daily basis. Like other Vishnu temples of Tamil Nadu, the priests belong to the Vaishnavaite community, from the Brahmin varna. The temple rituals are performed six times a day: Ushathkalam at 7:30 a.m., Kalasanthi at 8:00 a.m., Uchikalam at 12:00 p.m., Sayarakshai at 5:00 p.m., Irandamkalam at 6:00 p.m. and Ardha Jamam at 7:30 p.m. Each ritual has three steps: alangaram (decoration), neivethanam (food offering) and deepa aradanai (waving of lamps) for both Vaikuntanathan and Vaikundavalli. During the last step of worship, religious instructions in the Vedas (sacred text) are recited by priests, and worshippers prostrate themselves in front of the temple mast. There are weekly, monthly and fortnightly rituals performed in the temple. The Vaikasi Brahmotsavam, celebrated during the Tamil month of Vaikasi (May–June), and Vaikunta Ekadashi celebrated during the Tamil month of Margaḻi (December–January) are the two major festivals celebrated in the temple. Verses from Nalayira Divya Prabandham are recited by a group of temple priests amidst music with nadasvaram (pipe instrument) and tavil (percussion instrument).

Culture
This temple is revered in Nalayira Divya Prabandham, the 7th–9th century Vaishnava canon by Thirumangai Alvar in ten hymns. The temple is classified as a Divya Desam, one of the 108 Vishnu temples that are mentioned in the Sri Vaishnava canon. The temple is one of the fourteen Divya Desams in Kanchipuram and is part of Vishnu Kanchi, the place where most of the Vishnu temples in Kanchipuram are located. The temple is also revered in the verses of Divyakavi Pillai Perumal Iyengar.

The temple is declared as a heritage monument and administered by the Archaeological Survey of India as a protected monument.

Gallery

References

Sources

External links

Divya Desams
Hindu temples in Kanchipuram
Archaeological monuments in Tamil Nadu
Pallava architecture